This is a list of notable people from Palau.

Politicians 
 Johnson Toribiong, President of the Republic (2009-2012)
 Tommy Remengesau, President of the Republic (2001-2009) (2012-2020)
 Elias Camsek Chin, Senator in 8th OEK (National Congress); Former Vice-President of the Republic (2005-2009) Former President of the Senate 9th OEK.
 Kerai Mariur, Former Vice-President of the Republic (2009-2012) Floor Leader of the 10th OEK; VP Senate 11th OEK.
Hokkons Baules, Current President of the Senate 11th OEK. Senator 2nd, and 7th-11th OEK.
 Ngiratkel Etpison, President of the Republic (1989-1993)
 Kuniwo Nakamura, President of the Republic (1993-2001)
 Sandra Pierantozzi, former Vice President of the Republic (2001-2004)
 Haruo Remeliik, first President of the Republic (1981-1985)
 Lazarus Salii, President of the Republic (1985-1988)
 Roman Tmetuchl, former Palauan politician and businessman
Surangel Whipps Jr., Palauan-American business man, former Senator (2008-2016), and President of Palau since 2021
Uduch Sengebau Senior, attorney, former judge, former Senator, and Vice President of Palau since 2021

Artists and performers 
Sha Merirei, Palauan-American artist and activist
Bligh Madris, first Palauan MLB Player; debuted in June 20 2022 for the Pittsburgh Pirates

Palauans

Palauans
Palau